Anninos Marcoullides (born 8 February 1971 in Limassol, Lemesos) is a Cypriot retired sprinter who specialized in 100 and 200 metre races. He carried the flag for Cyprus at the opening ceremony of the 1996 Summer Olympics in Atlanta, Georgia.

Marcoullides,  competed from 1992 until 2004 and represented the island in four Olympic Games in Barcelona, Atlanta, Sydney and Athens. His best achievement was finishing in 15th place in the Atlanta 100 metres.

International competitions

Personal bests
100 metres - 10.12 s (1998)
200 metres - 20.43 s (1998)

References

1971 births
Living people
Sportspeople from Limassol
Cypriot male sprinters
Olympic athletes of Cyprus
Athletes (track and field) at the 1996 Summer Olympics
Athletes (track and field) at the 2000 Summer Olympics
Athletes (track and field) at the 2004 Summer Olympics
Commonwealth Games competitors for Cyprus
Athletes (track and field) at the 1994 Commonwealth Games
Athletes (track and field) at the 1998 Commonwealth Games
World Athletics Championships athletes for Cyprus
Universiade medalists in athletics (track and field)
Athletes (track and field) at the 1997 Mediterranean Games
Athletes (track and field) at the 2001 Mediterranean Games
Mediterranean Games gold medalists for Cyprus
Mediterranean Games silver medalists for Cyprus
Mediterranean Games bronze medalists for Cyprus
Mediterranean Games medalists in athletics
Universiade bronze medalists for Cyprus
Medalists at the 1997 Summer Universiade